The Cormier Range is a subrange of the Sifton Ranges, located between the Finlay River and Fox River in northern British Columbia, Canada. This northwest trending mountain range extends from Ware to Fox Pass.

References

External links
Cormier Range in the Canadian Mountain Encyclopedia

Cassiar Mountains
Mountain ranges of British Columbia